Richard Ely may refer to:
Richard T. Ely, American author and economist
Richard Ely (writer), Belgian writer